Czechoslovak Legions Graveyard in Vladivostok (also known as Czech Republic Cemetery) is a graveyard of the Czechoslovak Legions in Vladivostok, Russia. In total there are buried 163 Czechoslovak legionnaires, who fought in the Russian Far East in between 1918 and 1920. In 2005 the graveyard was reconstructed at the expense of the Czech Republic and in May 2006 it was reopened.

External links 
 Vladivostok – the last resting place of the Czechoslovak Legionnaires 
 Vladivostok, military graveyard 
 Graveyard of the Czechoslovak Legionnaires will wait to see its renewal 
 

Buildings and structures in Vladivostok
Cemeteries in Russia
Czech diaspora
Czechoslovakia–Soviet Union relations
Czechoslovak Legion
Slovak diaspora in Asia
Cultural heritage monuments of regional significance in Primorsky Krai
Cemeteries established in the 1910s